The Charles Town Oaks is a Grade III American Thoroughbred horse race for three year old fillies, over a distance of 7 furlongs on the dirt held annually in September at Hollywood Casino at Charles Town Races in Charles Town, West Virginia.  The event currently carries a purse of $500,000.

History

The event was inaugurated in 2009 with stakes of $250,000. With such a purse the race attracted several good fillies and by 2014 the event was classified as a Grade III with $500,000 stakes.

Records
Speed record: 
1:23.42  – Society  (2022)

Margins: 
  lengths – Miss Behaviour (2014)

Most wins by a jockey:
2  –  Fredy Peltroche  (2018, 2020)

Most wins by a trainer:
3  –  Steven M. Asmussen (2009, 2021, 2022)

Most wins by an owner:
 No owner has won the event more than once

Winners

Notes:

† In the 2021 running of the event R Adios Jersey was first past the post and wagering was paid out as the winner, however the horse returned a positive after tests showed the presence of flunixin in her system  and consequently was disqualified from the prizemoney and was placed tenth (last). Pauline's Pearl was declared the official winner of the event.

See also
List of American and Canadian Graded races

References

Graded stakes races in the United States
2009 establishments in West Virginia
Flat horse races for three-year-old fillies
Recurring sporting events established in 2009
Grade 3 stakes races in the United States